The Men's slalom competition of the Nagano 1998 Olympics was held at Shiga Kogen.

The defending world champion was Tom Stiansen of Norway, while Austria's Thomas Sykora was the defending World Cup slalom champion.

Results

References 

Men's slalom
Winter Olympics